The Men's Freestyle  79 kg is a competition featured at the 2019 European Wrestling Championships, and was held in Bucharest, Romania on April 8 and April 9.

Medalists

Results 
 Legend
 F — Won by fall
WO — Won by walkover

Main Bracket

Repechage

References

Men's freestyle 79